Sparta Brodnica  is a Polish football club playing currently in IV Liga. Founded in 1913 as Gymnasial Fussbal Club, it is based in Brodnica and plays at the Brodnica OSiR Stadium. The club was most successful in the nineties.

Most famous players of BKS Sparta are Łukasz Fabiański, Jakub Wawrzyniak, Robert Kłos and Jakub Zabłocki.

League Participations

Second Level: (6 seasons), 1994–1995, 1998–1999, 1999–2000, 2000–2001, 2001–2002, 2002–2003

Current squad

References

External links

Sparta official website (Polish)
Sparta Brodnica at facebook.com (Polish)
Sparta Brodnica at the facebook.com website (Polish)
Sparta Brodnica at the 90minut.pl website (Polish)

 
Association football clubs established in 1913
Brodnica County
Football clubs in Kuyavian-Pomeranian Voivodeship
1913 establishments in Germany
1913 establishments in Poland